Ken, Kenneth or Kenny Johnson may refer to:

Sports

Gridiron football
Ken Johnson (defensive end, born 1947) (born 1947), American football defensive end for the Cincinnati Bengals, played 1970–1977
Ken Johnson (defensive end, born 1955) (born 1955), American football defensive end for the Buffalo Bills and the Kansas City Chiefs
Kenny Johnson (American football) (born 1958), American football safety for the Atlanta Falcons and Houston Oilers
Kenneth Johnson (American football) (born 1963), American football defensive back for the 1987 Green Bay Packers
Ken "Pinto Ron" Johnson (born 1958), Buffalo Bills fan
Ken Johnson (quarterback) (born 1951), gridiron football quarterback, primarily in the CFL (1978–1982)

Basketball
Ken Johnson (basketball, born 1962), American basketball player for Michigan State and the Portland Trail Blazers
Ken Johnson (basketball, born 1978), American basketball player for Ohio State and the Miami Heat
Kenny Johnson (basketball), American basketball coach

Baseball
Ken Johnson (left-handed pitcher) (1923–2004), American baseball player, played 1947–1952
Ken Johnson (right-handed pitcher) (1933–2015), American baseball player, 1958–1970; pitched a no-hitter in 1964 game he lost

Other sports
Ken Johnson (footballer) (1931–2011), English-born association footballer who played for Hartlepools United
Ken Johnson (racing driver) (born 1962), American CART driver 1988–1989
Ken Johnson or Slick (wrestling) (born 1957), American professional wrestling manager
Ken Johnson (athlete) (1928–2015), British distance runner
Ken Johnson (sport shooter) (born 1968), American sport shooter
Kenneth Johnson (cricketer) (born 1923), South African cricketer

Other
Kenny Johnson (born 1963), American actor
Ken "Snakehips" Johnson (1914–1941), British jazz band leader and dancer, originally from British Guiana
Kenneth Alan Johnson (1931-1999), American theoretical physicist
Ken Johnson (art critic) (born 1953), American art critic
Kenneth Johnson (producer) (born 1942), American director, screenwriter and producer; creator of several science fiction television series
Kenneth Johnson (politician) (1944–2005), Canadian politician
Kenneth L. Johnson (1925–2015), British engineer
Kenneth P. Johnson (1934–2008), newspaper editor
Ken Johnson (Alabama politician), member of the Alabama House of Representatives

See also
Ken Johnston (disambiguation)